Zemskov is a surname. Notable people with the surname include:

 Mikhail Zemskov (born 1994), Russian footballer
 Viktor Zemskov (1946–2015), Russian historian

See also
Ýewgeniý Zemskow (born 1982), Turkmen footballer

Russian-language surnames